Wang Ming-hui (born 24 October 1985) is a Taiwanese rower. He competed at the 2004 Summer Olympics, 2008 Summer Olympics and the 2012 Summer Olympics.

References

1985 births
Living people
Taiwanese male rowers
Olympic rowers of Taiwan
Rowers at the 2004 Summer Olympics
Rowers at the 2008 Summer Olympics
Rowers at the 2012 Summer Olympics
Asian Games medalists in rowing
Rowers at the 2006 Asian Games
Rowers at the 2010 Asian Games
Rowers at the 2014 Asian Games
Rowers at the 2018 Asian Games
Asian Games silver medalists for Chinese Taipei
Medalists at the 2010 Asian Games
Medalists at the 2014 Asian Games
20th-century Taiwanese people
21st-century Taiwanese people